The 1973 Honduran Segunda División was the seventh season of the Honduran Segunda División.  Under the management of Alfonso Uclés, C.D. Federal won the tournament after defeating San Pedro in the final series and obtained promotion to the 1974–75 Honduran Liga Nacional.

Final

 Federal won 4–2 on aggregate.

References

Segunda
1973